Actinoscypha muelleri is a species of fungus belonging to the family Dermateaceae.

References

Dermateaceae